Punit Malhotra (born 13 May 1981) is an Indian film director who works in Hindi cinema. His first film, I Hate Luv Storys, released on 2 July 2010.

Early life and family
Punit Malhotra was born on 13 May 1981, in Mumbai, Maharashtra, and brought up in its Bandra coastal suburb, in a Punjabi family. His maternal grandfather Ram Dayal Sabarwal was a producer who launched Rekha. His first cousins are filmmakers Suneel and Dharmesh Darshan; well-known director David Dhawan is his father's first cousin; and the famous designer Manish Malhotra, who was also the costume designer for his first movie I Hate Luv Storys (2010), is his paternal uncle.

Career
Malhotra worked as an assistant director on Karan Johar's Kabhi Khushi Kabhie Gham (2001), Hansal Mehta’s Yeh Kya Ho Raha Hai? (2002), Nikhil Advani's Kal Ho Naa Ho (2003), Amol Palekar's Paheli (2005) and Tarun Mansukhani's Dostana (2008). Finally he made his debut as a director with I Hate Luv Storys (2010), which he also wrote.

Malhotra's second movie was Gori Tere Pyaar Mein, produced under Karan Johar's Dharma Productions, starring Kareena Kapoor and Imran Khan who were earlier paired in Ek Main Aur Ekk Tu.

In 2019 he directed the movie Student of the Year 2 starring Tiger Shroff, Tara Sutaria and Ananya Pandey 

In 2020 he directed music videos "Unbelievable" and "Casanova", both featuring Tiger Shroff.

Filmography

Director

Writer

References

External links

 
 

1981 births
Living people
Punjabi people
Film directors from Mumbai
People from Bandra
Hindi-language film directors
Indian male screenwriters
Hindi screenwriters
21st-century Indian film directors